Shelar is a census town in Thane district in the Indian state of Maharashtra.

Demographics
 India census, Shelar had a population of 10,615. Males constitute 62% of the population and females 38%. Shelar has an average literacy rate of 64%, higher than the national average of 59.5%: male literacy is 73%, and female literacy is 49%. In Shelar, 16% of the population is under 6 years of age.

References

Cities and towns in Thane district